William Penn Jones Jr. (October 14, 1914 – January 25, 1998) was an American journalist, the editor of the Midlothian Mirror and author. He was also one of the earliest John F. Kennedy assassination conspiracy theorists.

Early life and education
Jones was born in Lane's Chapel, Texas. He was one of eight children born to William Penn Jones, a sharecropper, and his wife Gussie Earline Jones (née Browning). Three of his siblings died in infancy. The family later bought a farm in Annona, Texas. After graduating from Clarksville High School in 1932, Jones attended Magnolia A&M Junior College for less than two years.

In 1935, he transferred to the University of Texas at Austin. It was there that Jones met an economic professor who he later credited with for influencing him to become a liberal. While at UT, Jones took law classes with classmates Henry Wade and John Connally. Wade later become the District Attorney in Dallas while Connolly would later become the 39th Governor of Texas. Both men were figures in the assassination of John F. Kennedy. In 1940, Jones dropped out of college later admitting that the coursework was too difficult.

Career

Military service
In 1933, Jones joined the Texas National Guard. In October 1940, he was called to active duty to fight in World War II. He served in 36th Infantry Division in the European theater of World War II. He retired from the Guard in 1963 upon which Texas governor John Connally promoted him to the rank of Brevet Brigadier General.

Publishing
In 1946, Jones purchased the Midlothian Mirror for $4,000; he eventually sold the newspaper in 1974. In 1963, Penn received the Elijah Parish Lovejoy Award for Courage in Journalism. Hugh Aynesworth was among those who nominated Jones for the award.

Assassination research

Jones was known for being an early critic of the Warren Commission's report on the assassination of John F. Kennedy and for alleging that 150 people connected to the assassination may have died under mysterious circumstances.

In 1967, he self-published Forgive My Grief, a four-volume work on the assassination of President Kennedy. In the 1980s, Jones co-edited The Continuing Inquiry newsletter with Gary Mack of the Sixth Floor Museum at Dealey Plaza. As Mack would later recall, "Penn was one of the first generation of researchers who felt the government was behind the assassination."

In 1981, Jones stated that he believed nine men, flown into Dallas from Oklahoma, each fired one bullet at Kennedy. He said the fatal headshot to Kennedy was fired from a manhole on Elm Street in Dealey Plaza.

Personal life
Jones was married twice and had two children. He married first wife Louise Angove in July 1941. They had two sons: Penn Jones III (born in 1944) and Michael (born in 1948). They divorced in 1983. That same year, Jones married Elaine Kavanaugh. They remained married until Jones' death.

Death
On January 25, 1998, Jones died of Alzheimer's disease in an Alvarado, Texas nursing home at the age of 83. His funeral was held at the St. Joseph's Catholic Church in Waxahachie, Texas.

He is survived by his wife and two sons, a brother, Douglas Jones, a sister, Ruby Nell Peek, and two grandchildren.

In the media
Jones appeared as himself in Mark Lane's 1976 documentary film, Two Men in Dallas. He introduces the viewer to the subject of the movie, Dallas policeman and assassination witness Roger Craig.

Bibliography
Books
 Forgive My Grief I. Midlothian, Tex.: Midlothian Mirror (1966). .
Preface by John Howard Griffin.
 Forgive My Grief II. Midlothian, Tex.: Midlothian Mirror (1967). .
"Further Critical Review of the Warren Commission Report on the Assassination of President John F. Kennedy."
 Forgive My Grief III. Midlothian, Tex.: Midlothian Mirror (1969). .
 Reprinted with addendum (January 1976).
"Further Critical Review of the Warren Commission Report on the Assassination of President John F. Kennedy."
 Forgive My Grief IV. Midlothian, Tex.: Penn Jones, Jr. (1974). .
"Further Critical Review of the Warren Commission Report on the Assassination of President John F. Kennedy."

Book contributions
 "Editorials from the Midlothian Mirror." In: Welsh, David (editor). In the Shadow of Dallas: A Primer on the Assassination of President Kennedy. San Francisco: Ramparts (1967): 29–49.

Periodicals
 Midlothian Mirror (1974–1963).
Weekly newspaper serving Midlothian, Texas.
 The Continuing Inquiry (1976–1984).
Monthly newsletter exploring the assassinations of John F. Kennedy, Robert F. Kennedy, and Martin Luther King, Jr.

Book reviews
 Review of Aphrodite: Desperate Mission by Jack Olsen. Continuing Inquiry, vol. 2, no. 11 (June 22, 1978): 1–5.
 Review of The Advance Man: An Off-beat Look at What Really Happens in Political Campaigns by Jerry Bruno and Jeff Greenfield. Continuing Inquiry, vol. 2, no. 11 (June 22, 1978): 8, 13.

Articles
 "The Purloined Letter (With apologies to Edgar Allen Poe)." Continuing Inquiry, vol. 1, no. 3 (October 22, 1976): 1–2.
 "Little Philosophy." Continuing Inquiry, vol. 1, no. 3 (October 22, 1976): 13–15.
 "If They're Serious." Continuing Inquiry, vol. 1, no. 4 (November 22, 1976): 11.
 "For Starters." Continuing Inquiry, vol. 1, no. 4 (November 22, 1976): 11.
 "A Little Philosophy (Continued from October issue)." Continuing Inquiry, vol. 1, no. 4 (November 22, 1976): 13–14. 
 "Sorensen, Director of Intelligence ???" Continuing Inquiry, vol. 1, no. 6 (January 22, 1977): 2–4.
 "November 22, 1963: Death of a Secret Service Agent?" with Gary Shaw. Continuing Inquiry, vol. 1, no. 6 (January 22, 1977): 4–6. 
 "The 'New' Oswald Letter." Continuing Inquiry, vol. 1, no. 7 (February 22, 1977): 9–10.
 "Instructing a Witness." Continuing Inquiry, vol. 1, no. 7 (February 22, 1977): 13–14. 
 "Disappearing Witnesses." The Rebel (magazine), vol. 1, no. 1 (November 22, 1983): 36–43.

References

Further reading
 Hetherly, Van (July 26, 1964). "Penn Jones: Texas' Toughest Country Editor." Houston Chronicle [Texas Magazine]. pp. 4–6, +.
 Staff writer (November 1966). "The Mythmakers." TIME, vol. 88, no. 20, pp. 33–34.
 Wrone, David R. (Autumn 1972). "The Assassination of John Fitzgerald Kennedy: An Annotated Bibliography." Wisconsin Magazine of History, vol. 56, no. 1, pp. 21–36. .
 Nash, H.C. (1977). Citizen's Arrest: The Dissent of Penn Jones Jr. in the Assassination of JFK. Latitudes Press. .
 Cloward, Tim (September 22, 2013). "Conspiracy-A-Go-Go: Dallas at the Fiftieth Anniversary of the Assassination." Southwest Review, vol. 98, no. 4, pp. 407–436. .

External links
 
 FBI files at Internet Archive
 William Penn Jones, Jr. at Spartacus Educational
 Penn Jones Collection at the W. R. Poage Legislative Library via Baylor University
 Correspondence at the Harold Weisberg Collection via Internet Archive
 Selected articles from the Midlothian Review at the Harold Weisberg Collection via Internet Archive

1914 births
1998 deaths
20th-century American non-fiction writers
20th-century American writers
American conspiracy theorists
American male journalists
United States Army personnel of World War II
American newspaper editors
American non-fiction writers
Neurological disease deaths in Texas
Deaths from Alzheimer's disease
Editors of Texas newspapers
John F. Kennedy conspiracy theorists
People from Bosque County, Texas
People from Red River County, Texas
Researchers of the assassination of John F. Kennedy
Texas National Guard personnel
University of Texas at Austin alumni
United States Army generals